4th Infantry Brigade may refer to:

United Kingdom
 4th Infantry Brigade (United Kingdom), a unit of the British 2nd Infantry Division in World War II
 4th London Infantry Brigade

Others
 4th Brigade (Australia), an Australian Army Reserve formation stationed in Victoria
 4th Light Horse Brigade, an Australian mounted infantry formation in World War I
 4th Infantry Brigade (Canada), a unit of the 2nd Canadian Division in World War I
 4th Infantry Brigade (Greece)
 4th Indian Infantry Brigade
 4th Infantry Brigade (New Zealand), a unit of the New Zealand Division in World War I
 4th Infantry Brigade (South Africa)

See also
4th Infantry Regiment (United States)
4th Infantry Regiment (Imperial Japanese Army)